Andrea Cistana (born 1 April 1997) is an Italian footballer who currently plays as a defender for Brescia.

Club career
He is a product of Brescia youth teams, and started playing for their Under-19 squad in the 2014–15 season. He also made some bench appearances in the 2014–15 Serie B, but did not see any time on the field.

For 2016–17 season, he went on loan to Serie D club Ciliverghe Mazzano.

On 31 January 2018, he joined Serie C club Prato on loan until the end of the season. He made his Serie C debut for Prato on 18 February 2018 in a game against Carrarese as a 54th-minute substitute for Daniele Ghidotti.

After his return from loan, he extended his contract with Brescia to 2021 on 10 September 2018. He made his Serie B debut for Brescia 5 days later in a game against Pescara, as a starter.

International career
Cistana was called up to the senior Italy squad by Roberto Mancini in November 2019.

Career statistics

References

External links
 

1997 births
Footballers from Brescia
Living people
Italian footballers
Association football defenders
Brescia Calcio players
A.C. Prato players
Serie A players
Serie B players
Serie C players
Serie D players